Melissa Anne Peterson (born December 17, 1968), known by her pen name Melissa Wiley, is an author of children's books, known especially for two book series about Laura Ingalls Wilder's ancestors: The Martha Years and The Charlotte Years. She is a contributing writer at Wired.com's GeekMom blog  and co-writes a webcomic with her husband, Scott Peterson, and illustrator Chris Gugliotti.

Personal life
Wiley resides in Portland, Oregon with her husband, comic book editor and author Scott Peterson, and six children. One of her sons (born ) has hearing loss.  Her oldest daughter (born ) had leukemia, but recovered. She is a stay-at-home mom and homeschools her children.

Books

Nonfiction 
 Antlers in Space and Other Common Phenomena (Split/Lip Press, 2017)
 Skull Cathedral: A Vestigial Anatomy (Autumn House Press, 2020)

Fiction 
 Anastasia: Together in Paris (Golden Books, 1997, as Melissa Peterson)
 Hanna's Christmas (HarperFestival, 2001, as Melissa Peterson)
 Fox and Crow Are Not Friends (Random House, 2012)
 The Prairie Thief (Margaret K. McElderry Books, 2012)
 Inch and Roly Make a Wish (Simon Spotlight, 2012)
 Inch and Roly and the Very Small Hiding Place (Simon Spotlight, 2013)
 Inch and Roly and the Sunny Day Scare (Simon Spotlight, 2013)
 The Nerviest Girl in the World (Knopf, 2020)

Little House: The Martha Years
Published by HarperCollins.
 Little House in the Highlands (1999)
 The Far Side of the Loch (2000)
 Down to the Bonny Glen (2001)
 Beyond the Heather Hills (2003)

Little House: The Charlotte Years
Published by HarperCollins.
 Little House by Boston Bay (1999)
 On Tide Mill Lane (2001)
 The Road from Roxbury (2002)
 Across the Puddingstone Dam (2004)

Carmen Sandiego Mysteries
Published by HarperCollins and credited to Melissa Peterson.
 Hasta la Vista, Blarney (1997)
 The Cocoa Commotion (1997)

References

External links

 Official website
 Into the Thicklebit webcomic
 Cook, Karla. "'I Remember Laura' - Books & Music". Ramblin' Roads. June 23, 2008.
 
 Melissa Peterson (real name) at LC Authorities, with 11 records and Peterson at WorldCat
 Anne James (joint pseudonym with husband Scott Peterson) at LC Authorities and James at WorldCat

1968 births
American children's writers
21st-century pseudonymous writers
Pseudonymous women writers
Living people
Place of birth missing (living people)